The 2010 Copa de la Reina de Fútbol was the 28th edition of the Spanish women's football cup. Espanyol won its fifth title.

Competition format
The competition was played by 14 teams from the Superliga Femenina: the eight teams of the group A and the three first qualified teams of the groups B and C.

The round of 16 and the quarterfinals were played with double-leg series while the semifinals and the final were played with a Final Four format in Basauri.

Bracket

Final

References

External links
Results at Arquero-Arba

Copa de la Reina
Women
2010